Marbury v. Madison, 5 U.S. (1 Cranch) 137 (1803), was a landmark U.S. Supreme Court case that established the principle of judicial review in the United States, meaning that American courts have the power to strike down laws and statutes that they find to violate the Constitution of the United States. Decided in 1803, Marbury is regarded as the single most important decision in American constitutional law. The Court's landmark decision established that the U.S. Constitution is actual law, not just a statement of political principles and ideals, and helped define the boundary between the constitutionally separate executive and judicial branches of the federal government.

The case originated in early 1801 as part of the political and ideological rivalry between outgoing President John Adams and incoming President Thomas Jefferson. Adams had lost the U.S. presidential election of 1800 to Jefferson. In March 1801, just two days before his term as president ended, Adams appointed several dozen Federalist Party supporters to new circuit judge and justice of the peace positions in an attempt to frustrate Jefferson and his supporters in the Democratic-Republican Party. The U.S. Senate quickly confirmed Adams's appointments. But outgoing Secretary of State John Marshall was unable to deliver all of the new judges' commissions before Adams's departure and Jefferson's inauguration. Jefferson believed the undelivered commissions were void and instructed his Secretary of State, James Madison, not to deliver them. One of the undelivered commissions belonged to William Marbury, a Maryland businessman who had been a strong supporter of Adams and the Federalists. In late 1801, after Madison had repeatedly refused to deliver his commission, Marbury filed a lawsuit in the Supreme Court asking the Court to issue a writ of mandamus forcing Madison to deliver his commission.

In an opinion written by John Marshall, the former Secretary of State who by then had been appointed Chief Justice of the United States, the Supreme Court held firstly that Madison's refusal to deliver Marbury's commission was illegal, and secondly that it was normally proper for a court in such situations to order the government official in question to deliver the commission. But in Marbury's case, the Court did not order Madison to comply. Examining the law Congress had passed to define the Supreme Court jurisdiction over types of cases like Marbury's—Section 13 of the Judiciary Act of 1789—the Court found that the Act had expanded the definition of the Supreme Court's jurisdiction beyond what was originally set forth in the U.S. Constitution. The Court then struck down Section 13 of the Act, announcing that American courts have the power to invalidate laws that they find to violate the Constitution—a power now known as "judicial review". Because striking down the law removed any jurisdiction the Court might have had over the case, the Court could not issue the writ that Marbury had requested.

Background

In the fiercely contested U.S. presidential election of 1800, the three main candidates were Thomas Jefferson, Aaron Burr, and the incumbent president, John Adams. Adams espoused the pro-business and pro-national-government politics of the Federalist Party and its leader Alexander Hamilton. Jefferson and Burr were leaders of the opposing Democratic-Republican Party, which favored agriculture and decentralization. American public opinion had gradually turned against the Federalists in the months leading up to the election, mainly due to the Federalists' use of the controversial Alien and Sedition Acts, as well as growing tensions with Great Britain, with whom the Federalists favored close ties. Jefferson easily won the election's popular vote but only narrowly defeated Adams in the Electoral College.

As the results of the election became clear, Adams and the Federalists became determined to exercise their remaining influence before Jefferson took office, and they did everything they could to fill federal offices with "anti-Jeffersonians" who were loyal to the Federalists. On March2, 1801, just two days before his presidential term ended, Adams nominated nearly 60 Federalist supporters to new circuit judge and justice of the peace positions the Federalist-controlled Congress had recently created. These last-minute nomineeswhom Jefferson's supporters derisively called the "Midnight Judges"included William Marbury, a prosperous businessman from Maryland. An ardent Federalist, Marbury was active in Maryland politics and had been a vigorous supporter of the Adams presidency.

The following day, March 3, the Senate approved Adams's nominations en masse. The appointees' commissions were immediately written out, then signed by Adams and sealed by Secretary of State John Marshall, who had been named the new Chief Justice of the Supreme Court in January but agreed to continue serving as Secretary of State for the remaining weeks of Adams's presidency. Marshall then dispatched his younger brother James Markham Marshall to deliver the commissions to the appointees. With only one day left before Jefferson's inauguration, James Marshall was able to deliver most of the commissions, but a fewincluding Marbury'swere not delivered.

The day after, March 4, 1801, Jefferson was sworn in and became the third President of the United States. Jefferson instructed his new Secretary of State, James Madison, to withhold the undelivered commissions. In Jefferson's opinion, the commissions were void because they had not been delivered before Adams left office. Without the commissions, the appointees were unable to assume the offices and duties to which they had been appointed.

Over the next several months, Madison continually refused to deliver Marbury's commission to him. Finally, in December 1801, Marbury filed a lawsuit against Madison in the U.S. Supreme Court, asking the Court to force Madison to deliver his commission. This lawsuit resulted in the case of Marbury v. Madison.

Decision

On February 24, 1803, the Supreme Court issued a unanimous 4–0 decision against Marbury. The Court's opinion was written by Chief Justice John Marshall, who structured the Court's opinion around a series of three questions it answered in turn:
 First, did Marbury have a right to his commission?
 Second, if Marbury had a right to his commission, was there a legal remedy for him to obtain it?
 Third, if there was such a remedy, could the Supreme Court legally issue it?

Marbury's right to his commission
The Court began by determining that Marbury had a legal right to his commission. Marshall reasoned that all appropriate procedures were followed: the commission had been properly signed and sealed. Madison had argued that the commissions were void if not delivered, but the Court disagreed, saying that the delivery of the commission was merely a custom, not an essential element of the commission itself.

The Court said that because Marbury's commission was valid, Madison's withholding it was "violative of a vested legal right" on Marbury's part.

Marbury's legal remedy
Turning to the second question, the Court said that the law provided Marbury a remedy for Madison's unlawful withholding of his commission. Marshall wrote that "it is a general and indisputable rule, that where there is a legal right, there is also a legal remedy by suit or action at law, whenever that right is invaded." This rule derives from the ancient Roman legal maxim  ("where there is a legal right, there is a legal remedy"), which was well established in the English common law. In what the American legal scholar Akhil Amar called "one of the most important and inspiring passages" of the opinion, Marshall wrote:

The Court then confirmed that a writ of mandamusa type of court order that commands a government official to perform an act their official duties legally require them to performwas the proper remedy for Marbury's situation. But this raised the issue of whether the Court, which was part of the judicial branch of the government, had the power to command Madison, who as secretary of state was part of the executive branch of the government. The Court held that so long as the remedy involved a mandatory duty to a specific person, and not a political matter left to discretion, the courts could provide the legal remedy. Borrowing a phrase John Adams had drafted in 1779 for the Massachusetts State Constitution, Marshall wrote: "The government of the United States has been emphatically termed a government of laws, and not of men."

The Supreme Court's jurisdiction

This brought Marshall to the third question: did the Supreme Court have proper jurisdiction over the case that would allow it to legally issue the writ of mandamus? The answer depended entirely on how the Court interpreted the text of the Judiciary Act of 1789. Congress had passed the Judiciary Act to establish the American federal court system, since the U.S. Constitution only mandates a Supreme Court and leaves the rest of the U.S. federal judicial power to reside in "such inferior Courts as the Congress may from time to time ordain and establish." Section 13 of the Judiciary Act sets out the Supreme Court's original and appellate jurisdictions.

Marbury had argued that the language of Section 13 of the Judiciary Act gave the Supreme Court the authority to issue writs of mandamus when hearing cases under original jurisdiction, not just appellate jurisdiction. As Marshall explains in the opinion,  gives a court the power to be the first to hear and decide a case;  gives a court the power to hear an appeal from a lower court's decision and to "revise and correct" the previous decision. Although the language on the power to issue writs of mandamus appears after Section 13's sentence on appellate jurisdiction, rather than with the earlier sentences on original jurisdiction, a semicolon separates it from the clause on appellate jurisdiction. The section does not make clear whether the mandamus clause was intended to be read as part of the appellate clause or on its own—in the opinion, Marshall quoted only the end of the section—and the law's wording can plausibly be read either way. In the end, the Court agreed with Marbury and interpreted section 13 of the Judiciary Act to have authorized the Court to exercise original jurisdiction over cases involving disputes over writs of mandamus.

But as Marshall pointed out, this meant that the Judiciary Act contradicted Article III of the U.S. Constitution, which establishes the judicial branch of the U.S. government. Article III defines the Supreme Court's jurisdiction as follows:

Article III says that the Supreme Court only has original jurisdiction over cases where a U.S. state is a party to a lawsuit or where a lawsuit involves foreign dignitaries. Neither of these categories covered Marbury's lawsuit, which was a dispute over a writ of mandamus for his justice of the peace commission. So, according to the Constitution, the Court did not have original jurisdiction over a case like Marbury's.

But the Court had interpreted the Judiciary Act to have given it original jurisdiction over lawsuits for writs of mandamus. This meant that the Judiciary Act had taken the Constitution's initial scope for the Supreme Court's original jurisdiction, which did not cover cases involving writs of mandamus, and expanded it to include them. The Court ruled that Congress cannot increase the Supreme Court's original jurisdiction as it was set down in the Constitution, and it therefore held that the relevant portion of Section 13 of the Judiciary Act violated Article III of the Constitution.

Judicial review and striking down the law

After ruling that it conflicted with the Constitution, the Court struck down Section 13 of the Judiciary Act in the U.S. Supreme Court's first ever declaration of the power of judicial review. The Court ruled that American federal courts have the power to refuse to give any effect to congressional legislation that is inconsistent with their interpretation of the Constitutiona move colloquially known as "striking down" laws.

The U.S. Constitution does not explicitly give the American federal judiciary the power of judicial review. Nevertheless, the Court's opinion gives many reasons in support of the judiciary's possession of the power. First, Marshall reasoned that the written nature of the Constitution inherently established judicial review. Borrowing from Alexander Hamilton's essay Federalist No. 78, Marshall wrote:

Second, the Court declared that deciding the constitutionality of the laws it applies is an inherent part of the American judiciary's role. In what has become the most famous and frequently quoted line of the opinion, Marshall wrote:

Marshall reasoned that the Constitution places limits on the American government's powers, and that those limits would be meaningless unless they were subject to judicial review and enforcement. He reasoned that the Constitution's provisions limiting Congress's powersuch as the export tax clause or the prohibitions on bills of attainder and ex post facto lawsmeant that in some cases judges would be forced to choose between enforcing the Constitution or following Congress. Marshall held "virtually as a matter of iron logic" that in the event of conflict between the Constitution and statutory laws passed by Congress, the constitutional law must be supreme.

Third, the Court said that denying the supremacy of the Constitution over Congress's acts would mean that "courts must close their eyes on the constitution, and see only the law." This, Marshall wrote, would make Congress omnipotent, since none of the laws it passed would ever be invalid.

Marshall then gave several other reasons in favor of judicial review. He reasoned that the authorization in Article III of the Constitution that the Court can decide cases arising "under this Constitution" implied that the Court had the power to strike down laws conflicting with the Constitution. This, Marshall wrote, meant that the Founders were willing to have the American judiciary use and interpret the Constitution when judging cases. He also said that federal judges' oaths of office—in which they swear to discharge their duties impartially and "agreeably to the Constitution and laws of the United States"—requires them to support the Constitution. Lastly, Marshall reasoned that judicial review is implied in the Supremacy Clause of Article VI of the U.S. Constitution, since it declares that the supreme law of the United States is the Constitution and laws made "in Pursuance thereof", rather than the Constitution and all federal laws generally.

Having given his list of reasons, Marshall concluded the Court's opinion by reaffirming the Court's ruling on the invalidity of Section 13 of the Judiciary Act and, therefore, the Court's inability to issue Marbury's writ of mandamus.

Analysis

Political dilemma

Besides its legal issues, the case of Marbury v. Madison also created a difficult political dilemma for John Marshall and the Supreme Court. If the Court had ruled in Marbury's favor and issued a writ of mandamus ordering Madison to deliver Marbury's commission, Jefferson and Madison would probably have simply ignored the writ, which would have made the Court look impotent and emphasized the "shakiness" of the judiciary. On the other hand, a simple ruling against Marbury would have given Jefferson and the Democratic-Republicans a clear political victory over the Federalists.

Marshall solved both problems. First, he had the Court rule that Madison's withholding of Marbury's commission was illegal, which pleased the Federalists. Second, however, the opinion he wrote also held that the Court could not grant Marbury his requested writ of mandamus, which gave Jefferson and the Democratic-Republicans the result they desired. But finally, in what the American legal scholar Laurence Tribe calls "an oft-told tale ... [that] remains awe-inspiring", Marshall had the Court rule against Marbury in a way that maneuvered Marbury's simple petition for a writ of mandamus into a case that presented a question that went to the heart of American constitutional law itself. The American political historian Robert G. McCloskey described:

Marshall had been looking for a case suitable for introducing judicial review and was eager to use the situation in Marbury to establish his claim. He introduced judicial reviewa move Jefferson decriedbut used it to strike down a provision of a law that he read to have expanded the Supreme Court's powers, and thereby produced Jefferson's hoped-for result of Marbury losing his case. Marshall "seized the occasion to uphold the institution of judicial review, but he did so in the course of reaching a judgment that his political opponents could neither defy nor protest." Though Jefferson criticized the Court's decision, he accepted it, and Marshall's opinion in Marbury "articulate[d] a role for the federal courts that survives to this day." The American legal scholar Erwin Chemerinsky concludes: "The brilliance of Marshall's opinion cannot be overstated."

Legal criticism
Marshall's historic opinion in Marbury v. Madison continues to be the subject of critical analysis and inquiry. In a 1955 Harvard Law Review article, U.S. Supreme Court Justice Felix Frankfurter emphasized that one can criticize Marshall's opinion in Marbury without demeaning it: "The courage of Marbury v. Madison is not minimized by suggesting that its reasoning is not impeccable and its conclusion, however wise, not inevitable."

Criticisms of Marshall's opinion in Marbury usually fall into two general categories. First, some criticize the way Marshall "strove" to reach the conclusion that the U.S. Supreme Court has constitutional authority over the other branches of the U.S. government. Today, American courts generally follow the principle of "constitutional avoidance": if a certain interpretation of a law raises constitutional problems, they prefer to use alternative interpretations that avoid these problems, so long as the alternative interpretations are still plausible. In Marbury, Marshall could have avoided the constitutional questions through different legal rulings. If he had ruled that Marbury did not have a right to his commission until it was delivered, or if he had ruled that refusals to honor political appointments could only be remedied through the political process and not the judicial process, it would have ended the case immediately and the Court would not have reached the case's constitutional issues. Marshall did not do so, and many legal scholars have criticized him for it. Some scholars have responded that the "constitutional avoidance" principle did not exist in 1803, and in any case is "only a general guide for Court action", not an "ironclad rule". Alternatively, it has also been argued that the claim that Marshall "strove" to create a controversy largely vanishes when the case is viewed from the legal perspective of the late 18th century, when American colonies' and states' supreme courts were largely modeled on England's Court of King's Bench, which inherently possessed mandamus powers.

Second, Marshall's arguments for the Court's authority are sometimes said to be mere "series of assertions", rather than substantive reasons logically laid out to support his position. Scholars generally agree that Marshall's series of assertions regarding the U.S. Constitution and the actions of the other branches of government do not "inexorably lead to the conclusion that Marshall draws from them." Marshall's assertion of the American judiciary's authority to review executive branch actions was the most controversial issue when Marbury was first decided, and several subsequent U.S. presidents have tried to dispute it, to varying degrees. 

Additionally, it is questionable whether Marshall should have participated in the Marbury case because of his participating role in the dispute. Marshall was still the acting secretary of state when the nominations were made, and he had signed Marbury and the other men's commissions and had been responsible for their delivery. This potential conflict of interest raises strong grounds for Marshall to have recused himself from the case. In hindsight, the fact that Marshall did not recuse himself from Marbury is likely indicative of his eagerness to hear the case and use it to establish judicial review.

Legacy
Marbury v. Madison is regarded as the single most important decision in American constitutional law.  It established U.S. federal judges' authority to review the constitutionality of Congress's legislative acts, and to this day the Supreme Court's power to review the constitutionality of American laws at both the federal and state level "is generally rested upon the epic decision of Marbury v. Madison."

Although the Court's opinion in Marbury established judicial review in American federal law, it did not invent or create it. Some 18th-century British jurists had argued that English courts had the power to circumscribe Parliament. The idea became widely accepted in Colonial Americaespecially in Marshall, Jefferson, and Madison's native Virginiaunder the rationale that in America only the people were sovereign, rather than the government, and so the courts should only implement legitimate laws. By the time of the Constitutional Convention in 1787, American courts' "independent power and duty to interpret the law" was well established, and Hamilton had defended the concept in Federalist No. 78. In addition, the 1796 Supreme Court case Hylton v. United States considered whether a tax on carriages was constitutional, though the Court ruled that the statute in question was in fact constitutional and did not actually exercise the power. Nevertheless, Marshall's opinion in Marbury was the power's first announcement and exercise by the Supreme Court. It made the practice more routine, rather than exceptional, and prepared the way for the Court's opinion in the 1819 case McCulloch v. Maryland, in which Marshall implied that the Supreme Court was the supreme interpreter of the U.S. Constitution.

Marbury also established that the power of judicial review covers actions by the executive branch—the President and his cabinet members.  However, American courts' power of judicial review over executive branch actions only extends to matters in which the executive has a legal duty to act or refrain from acting, and does not extend to matters that are entirely within the President's discretion, such as whether to veto a bill or whom to appoint to an office. This power has been the basis of many subsequent important Supreme Court decisions in American history, such as the 1974 decision United States v. Nixon, in which the Court held that President Richard Nixon had to comply with a subpoena to provide tapes of his conversations for use in a criminal trial related to the Watergate scandal, and which ultimately led to Nixon's resignation.

Although it is a potent check on the other branches of the U.S. government, federal courts rarely exercised the power of judicial review in early American history. After deciding Marbury in 1803, the Supreme Court did not strike down another federal law until 1857, when the Court struck down the Missouri Compromise in its now-infamous decision Dred Scott v. Sandford, a ruling that contributed to the outbreak of the American Civil War.

See also
 Australian Communist Party v Commonwealth
 Calder v. Bull
 Hylton v. United States
 Martin v. Hunter's Lessee

References

Notes

Citations

Works cited

Further reading
  (one introduction to the case)
  (Claims that it is a mistake to read the case as claiming a judicial power to tell the President or Congress what they can or cannot do under the Constitution.)
 
 
 James M. O'Fallon, The Case of Benjamin More: A Lost Episode in the Struggle over Repeal of the 1801 Judiciary Act, 11  43 (1993).

External links

 
 Primary Documents in American History: Marbury v. Madison from the Library of Congress
 "John Marshall, Marbury v. Madison, and Judicial Review—How the Court Became Supreme" Lesson plan for grades 9–12 from National Endowment for the Humanities
 The 200th Anniversary of Marbury v. Madison: The Reasons We Should Still Care About the Decision, and The Lingering Questions It Left Behind
 The Establishment of Judicial Review
 The 200th Anniversary of Marbury v. Madison: The Supreme Court's First Great Case
 Case Brief for Marbury v. Madison at Lawnix.com
 
 "Supreme Court Landmark Case Marbury v. Madison" from C-SPAN's Landmark Cases: Historic Supreme Court Decisions
 

1803 in United States case law
6th United States Congress
19th-century American trials
Legal history of the District of Columbia
Presidency of Thomas Jefferson
United States Constitution Article Three case law
United States constitutional case law
United States political question doctrine case law
United States Supreme Court cases
United States Supreme Court original jurisdiction cases
United States Supreme Court cases of the Marshall Court